Frederick Hugh Wilkinson MM (two bars), ED was the 7th Bishop of Toronto.

Life and ministry
Wilkinson was born in 1896 into an ecclesiastical family and educated at the University of Toronto. He was ordained in 1925.

He began his ordained ministry as a curate at the  Church of the Ascension, Hamilton, Ontario. After this he was a professor at the  College of Emmanuel and St. Chad, Saskatoon and  then Rector of  St Stephen's Calgary . He was Sub-Dean of Christ Church Cathedral, Vancouver from 1932 to 1936. Further incumbencies at St James's Montreal and St Paul's  Toronto followed before he became a coadjutor bishop of the Diocese of Toronto in 1953 and its diocesan bishop in 1955. He served until 1966 and died in 1980.

References 

1896 births
People from Nova Scotia
University of Toronto alumni
Canadian recipients of the Military Medal
Anglican bishops of Toronto
20th-century Anglican Church of Canada bishops
1980 deaths